Fatumanongi is an island in Tonga. It is located within the Ha'apai Group in the centre of the country, to the northeast of the national capital of Nukualofa.

Geography 
The nearest islands are Fotuha'a to the south and Niniva to the east. The island of Kao lies to the west, and the Ava Tauoifi Strait lies to the south.

Climate 
The climate is tropical hot. Like the other islands of the Ha'apai Group, Fatumanongi is occasionally hit by cyclones.

References 

Islands of Tonga
Haʻapai